The 1967 U.S. Women's Open was the 22nd U.S. Women's Open, held June 29 to July 2 at the Cascades Course of The Homestead, in Hot Springs, Virginia.

This winner was Catherine Lacoste, age 22, the first international and youngest champion at the time and the only amateur to ever win the title. She held a five-stroke lead after 36 and 54 holes, and despite a final round 79, held on for a two-stroke victory margin over runners-up Susie Maxwell and Beth Stone. It was also the first win by an amateur on the LPGA Tour.

Defending champion Sandra Spuzich finished fifteen strokes back, tied for 27th place.

Past champions in the field

Source:

Final leaderboard
Sunday, July 2, 1967

Source:

References

External links
Golf Observer final leaderboard
U.S. Women's Open Golf Championship
U.S. Women's Open – past champions – 1967
The Omni Homestead Resort: Golf

U.S. Women's Open
Golf in Virginia
Sports competitions in Virginia
U.S. Women's Open
U.S. Women's Open
U.S. Women's Open
U.S. Women's Open
U.S. Women's Open
Women's sports in Virginia